A Dream is an album by Max Romeo, released in 1969.

The album, due to its cover design, is often referred to as A Dream by Max Romeo. Produced by Bunny Lee, it featured Max Romeo's first hit, the lyrically explicit "Wet Dream". Tracks like "Wood Under Cellar", "Wine Her Goosie" and "The Horn" continued the rude theme, though songs such as "Far Far Away" and "Love" were more traditional ballads, the latter made more outstanding through vibrant Rastafari-influenced percussion; "Club Raid" speaks of Romeo’s survival of a punitive police bust.

Track listing
All tracks composed by Max Romeo except where indicated.

Side A
"Wet Dream" - 2:45
"A No Fe Me Piccn'y" - 3:12
"Far Far Away" - 3:01
"The Horn" - 2:22
"Hear My Plea" - 3:24
"Love" - 3:02
Side B
"I Don't Want to Lose Your Love" - 3:00
"Wood Under Cellar" - 2:30
"Wine Her Goosie" (Harry Dee) - 3:03
"Club Raid" - 2:43
"You Can't Stop Me" - 2:20

Personnel
Max Romeo - vocals
Errol Daniels - lead guitar
The Rudies - backing band
Derrick Morgan, Ranford "Ronnie" Williams - arrangements
Technical
Tony Pike - engineer
Carl Palmer, Jeff Palmer - cover

Singles
1968: "Wet Dream"
1969: "Wine Her Goosie"

References

1969 debut albums
Max Romeo albums
Pama Records albums